Sandip Mandi (born 11 June 2002) is an Indian professional footballer who plays as a defender for I-League club Mohammedan.

Playing career

Jamshedpur
Mandi made his debut for Jamshedpur in January 2020.

Career statistics

Club

References

External links 
 

2002 births
Indian footballers
Living people
Footballers from West Bengal
Jamshedpur FC players
Association football defenders
Indian Super League players